The 1901–02 St Helens R.F.C. season was the club's seventh as members of the Northern Rugby Football Union, and the 28th in their history. This season, the two county leagues, Yorkshire and Lancashire, were merged to form the Northern Rugby League. As St Helens failed to make the qualification criteria due to last season's disappointing finish, they competed in the Lancashire Senior Championship, in which they finished third, and a new-found concurrent South West Lancashire mini-league, in which they finished bottom. In the Challenge Cup, St Helens were beaten in the first round by Hull Kingston Rovers.

Lancashire Senior Championship

 Hull Kingston Rovers, Stockport, Altrincham and Radcliffe each had 2 points deducted for a breach of the professional rules.

References

St Helens R.F.C. seasons
1901 in English rugby league
1902 in English rugby league